A list of English Language words derived from the Celtic Gaulish language, entering English via Old Frankish or Vulgar Latin and Old French

 ambassador  from Old French embassadeur, from Latin ambactus, from Gaulish *ambactos, "servant", "henchman", "one who goes about".
 beak  from Old French bec, from Latin beccus, from Gaulish beccos.
 bilge  from Old French boulge, from Latin bulga, from Gaulish bulgā, "sack".
 bran  from Gaulish brennos, through the French bren, "the husk of wheat", "barley...".
 branch  from Late Latin branca through Old French branche, probably ultimately of Gaulish origin.
 brave  from Prov/Cat brau, from Gaulish bragos.
 budge (lambskin)  from Old French bulge, from Latin bulga, from Gaulish bulgā, "sack".
 brie  from Gaulish briga "hill, height"
 budget  from Old French bougette, from bouge, from Latin bulga, from Gaulish bulgā. 
 bulge  from Old French boulge, from Latin bulga, from Gaulish bulgā, "sack".
 car  from Norman French carre, from L. carrum, carrus (pl. carra), orig. "two-wheeled Celtic war chariot," from Gaulish karros.
 carry  From Gaulish karros "two-wheeled Celtic war chariot" via French
 cream  from Old French cresme, from the Latin word of Gaulish origin crāmum.
 change  from Old French changier, "to change, alter", from the late Latin word cambiare derived from an older Latin word cambire, "to barter, exchange", a word of Gaulish origin, from PIE root *kemb- "to bend, crook". 
 druid  From Gaulish Druides via French
 dune  from French dune, from Middle Dutch dūne, probably from Gaulish dunum, "hill".
 embassy  from Middle French , from Italian ambasciata, from Old Provençal ambaisada, from Latin Ambactus, from Gaulish *ambactos, "servant", "henchman", "one who goes about".
 frown  Probably from Gaulish *frogna "nostril" via Old French frognier "to frown or scowl, snort, turn up one's nose"
 glean  from Old French glener, from Late Latin , from Gaulish glanos, "clean".
 gob  from Old French gobe, likely from Gaulish *gobbo-.
 gouge  Probably from Gaulish via Late Latin/Old French
 javelin from Old French javelline, diminutive of javelot, from Vulgar Latin gabalus, from Gaulish gabalum.
 mutton  From Gallo-Roman *multo-s via Old French
 palfrey  from Old French palefrei, from Latin paraverēdus from Greek para + Latin verēdus, from Gaulish *vorēdos.
 piece  from Old French, from Vulgar Latin *pettia, likely from Gaulish.
 quay  from Old French chai, from Gaulish caium.
 tonsil  Perhaps of Gaulish origin via Latin
 truant  from Old French, from Gaulish *trougo-, "miser".
 valet  from French, from Gallo-Romance *vassallittus, from Middle Latin vassallus, from vassus, from Old Celtic *wasso-, "young man", "squire".
 varlet  from Middle French, from Gallo-Romance *vassallittus, from Middle Latin vassallus, from vassus, from Old Celtic *wasso-, "young man", "squire".
 vassal  from Old French, from Middle Latin vassallus, from vassus, from Old Celtic *wasso-, "young man", "squire".

References

External links 

 Online Etymology Dictionary

English
Gaulish